Michael Owen (born 7 November 1980 in Pontypridd), is a former Welsh international rugby union player, who most often played Number 8, but was also versatile enough to play flanker or even lock. His ball handling was arguably his greatest asset.

Club career
Having been educated at Bryn Celynnog Comprehensive School in Beddau, Owen played for Pontypridd RFC from 1999 until in 2003 the side merged with Bridgend RFC to form the ill-fated Celtic Warriors and then played for the Newport Gwent Dragons in the Celtic League from 2003 until 2008.

Owen joined Guinness Premiership side Saracens for the 2008/2009 season after signing a two-year deal with the club.

International career 
Owen became the 1,000th player capped by Wales when he made his debut in the first Test against South Africa in June 2002.

He took over from the injured Gareth Thomas as Wales captain during the 2005 Six Nations, and became the 122nd Captain of his country when he led Wales out against Scotland and led Wales to its first Grand Slam in 27 years.

Owen was selected for the British & Irish Lions for their 2005 New Zealand tour. On 23 May in Cardiff, he had the honour of captaining the side for their match at Millennium Stadium against Argentina, the first Lions Test match to take place outside of the touring country. He temporarily returned home for the birth of his second child.

International tries

Post professional rugby career
In July 2010, Owen announced his retirement from the game at 29 due to a persistent knee problem and embarked on a two-year master's degree course in Business at the University of Hertfordshire.

In March 2010 he began coaching at Hertford RFC, helping them to gain National 2 league status for the 2011/12 season.

Owen was a co-commentator for ITV's coverage of the 2011 Rugby World Cup.

From September 2013 Owen took up the position of Director of Rugby at Haileybury College.

References

External links
Pontypridd profile
Newport Gwent Dragons profile
Wales profile
Saracens profile
Sporting-Heroes.net (Part 1)
Sporting-Heroes.net (Part 2)
Welsh Rugby Union

1980 births
Living people
Rugby union locks
Rugby union flankers
Rugby union number eights
Welsh rugby union coaches
Welsh rugby union players
British & Irish Lions rugby union players from Wales
Rugby union players from Pontypridd
Pontypridd RFC players
Dragons RFC players
Wales rugby union captains
Saracens F.C. players
Wales international rugby union players
Alumni of the University of Glamorgan
Alumni of the University of South Wales